Cellcom is an Israeli telecommunications company.
Founded in 1994, most of the company's business is centered on wireless service. Its current CEO is Avi Gabbay, who was appointed on 4 January 2020. As of June 2016, Cellcom had 2.812 million subscribers.

History

Cellcom's entry into the Israeli market caused a revolution in wireless services in the country, as it offered service at rates which were a fraction of those charged by Pelephone, which until Cellcom's launch held a monopoly on cellular services in Israel. Its launch was not without problems though and during 1995, Cellcom subscribers experienced widespread service disruptions of unknown origin. After an intensive investigation, the cause was finally traced to a software bug in Motorola's MicroTAC Alpha handsets – which were ubiquitous on its network at the time.

Network

Cellcom initially operated a TDMA network nationwide in the 850 MHz band, but after winning tenders for GSM-1800 frequencies it began offering GSM services, and eventually sought to replace the 850 MHz TDMA frequencies it owns with standard 900 MHz GSM frequencies, but Pelephone and Partner petitioned the Ministry of Communications to deny this for technical reasons. This put Cellcom at a disadvantage since, though most of its users had converted to GSM, they were not able to make use of the lower frequency's better in-building penetration and greater cell reach.

With its entry into 3G wireless services, Cellcom demonstrated the first mobile video call in Israel. Since the beginning of 2006, Cellcom has been deploying a 3G UMTS-2100 network nationwide, which by the end of 2007 covered than 87% of the population. Cellcom was the first in Israel to launch an HSDPA network (also called "Generation 3.5") nationwide.

In 2011, Cellcom began to deploy UMTS services in the 850 MHz band, employing unused capacity in that frequency range since by then it had very few TDMA customers remaining. The Israeli Ministry of Communications has approved Cellcom's plan to shut down the TDMA-850 network on 31 December 2011. In August 2014, Cellcom launched an LTE network in the 1800 MHz band.

Controversy and criticism

In 2009, Cellcom launched an ad campaign showing Israel Defense Forces soldiers playing football across the Israeli West Bank barrier. Ahmad Tibi, an Arab-Israeli member of the Knesset, called on Cellcom to withdraw the commercial.

A major service outage across the country on 1 December 2010 impacted on Cellcom's Q4 results. The company decided to refund customers with one week's worth of calls and messages although the customers never actually received their refund, says Daniel Martinez of The Jerusalem Post.

On 18 May 2021, Cellcom ceased its operations for one hour in support for Jewish-Arab coexistence and solidarity with Palestinians.  Many thousands of Israelis cancelled their service in response.

Involvement in Israeli settlements

On 12 February 2020, the United Nations published a database of 112 companies helping to further Israeli settlement activity in the West Bank, including East Jerusalem, as well as in the occupied Golan Heights. These settlements are considered illegal under international law. Cellcom was listed on the database on account of its "provision of services and utilities supporting the maintenance and existence of settlements" and "the use of natural resources, in particular water and land, for business
purposes" in these occupied territories.

On 5 July 2021, Norway's largest pension fund KLP said it would divest from Cellcom together with 15 other business entities implicated in the UN report for their links to Israeli settlements in the occupied West Bank.

See also
 Hot Mobile
 Partner Communications Company
 Golan Telecom
 Communications in Israel
 List of mobile network operators of Israel

References

External links
 
Cellcom investor relations
Cellcom Customer Service
Cellcom on Google Finance

Companies formerly listed on the New York Stock Exchange
Mobile phone companies of Israel
Companies listed on the Tel Aviv Stock Exchange
Israeli brands
1994 establishments in Israel
Companies based in Netanya
2007 initial public offerings